George Baird may refer to:

 George Baird (architect) (born 1939), Canadian architect
 George Baird (athlete) (1907–2004), American athlete and 1928 Summer Olympics gold medal winner
 George Alexander Baird (1861–1893), British racehorse owner, breeder and amateur jockey
 George Frederick Baird (1851–1899), Canadian politician and lawyer
 George Husband Baird (1761–1840), Church of Scotland minister and Principal of the University of Edinburgh
 George M. Baird (1839–?), New York politician
 George Thomas Baird (1847–1917), Canadian politician
 George W. Baird (1839–1906), US Army officer and Medal of Honor recipient

See also
 George Baird Hodge (1828–1892), attorney, Confederate politician and general from the Commonwealth of Kentucky